Mariholm is the highest and easternmost island in a small group which lies  south of Moe Island in the South Orkney Islands, Antarctica. It was named on a chart based upon a running survey of the South Orkney Islands by Captain Petter Sorlle in 1912–13.

See also 
 List of antarctic and sub-antarctic islands

References

Islands of the South Orkney Islands